This is a list of record home attendances of Australian soccer clubs. It lists the highest attendance of all current and past National Soccer League and A-League Men clubs for a competitive home match.

List
Records correct as of 27 January 2023. Italics denote attendance record set at ground not designated as usual home ground; Bold denote attendance record set at current ground.

Notes
 Does not include finals matches.

See also

References

Australian soccer club statistics
Football club attendances
attendances